Edwin Francis Reynolds LRIBA (30 November 1875 - 19 January 1949) was an English architect based in Birmingham.

Life

He was educated at King Edward's School, Birmingham, and then articled to Cossins & Peacock from 1893 to 1896. From 1897 to 1899 he was assistant to William Henry Bidlake, and then from 1900 to 1901 to Runtz & Ford.

He started his own practice in 1905.

He was appointed Licentiate of the Royal Institute of British Architects in 1911.

Works

All Saints' Church, Four Oaks 1908 
St Germain’s Church, Edgbaston 1915 - 1917
Taylor & Challen factory, Constitution Hill, Birmingham 1919 - 1921
House, 11 Pritchards Road, Edgbaston 1926
House, 13 Pritchards Road, Edgbaston 1927 
St Mary's Church, Pype Hayes 1929 - 1930
The Shaftmoor public house, Hall Green 1930
The Abbey public house, Bearwood 1931
The Grant Arms public house, Cotteridge 1932
St Gabriel's Church, Weoley Castle 1934
The Towers public house, Walsall Road 1935
The Three Magpies public house, Hall Green 1935
St Hilda’s Church, Warley Woods 1938 - 1940

Restorations and other works

Packwood House 1925 - 1932 Restoration
Crown Inn, Brindley Place 1930 Reconstruction 
St Alban's Church, Bordesley 1938 Addition of tower and spire

References

1875 births
1949 deaths
Architects from Birmingham, West Midlands
People educated at King Edward's School, Birmingham